Strada statale 12 dell'Abetone e del Brennero (SS 12) is a national highway in Italy that connects Pisa to the Austrian border at Brenner Pass.

References 

12
Transport in South Tyrol
Transport in Trentino
Transport in Emilia-Romagna
Transport in Lombardy
Transport in Pisa
Transport in Tuscany
Transport in Veneto